Charles Jean Marie Degeorge (1837 Lyon – 1888 Paris) was a French sculptor, and medallist, whose best-known work, La jeunesse d'Aristote (The Youth of Aristotle) (1875) depicts the philosopher as a semi-nude  teenage boy sitting in a large chair, looking bored as he studies a scroll.

Degeorge also sculpted a bust of Henri Regnault which was incorporated into Regnault's monument at the École des Beaux Arts, Paris.

External links

Courtauld Institute: Monument to Henri Regnault

References 

1837 births
1888 deaths
Prix de Rome for engraving
Sculptors from Lyon
Burials at Père Lachaise Cemetery
19th-century French sculptors
French male sculptors
19th-century French male artists